The Crying Woman (original title: La Femme qui pleure) is a 1979 French drama film directed by Jacques Doillon.

Plot
Jacques comes back after a long absence from his wife, Dominique, and their daughter, Lola. They live in an isolated house located on a hill in Haute-Provence. Dominique cries when she sees him. 

She had driven him away because she cannot stand the way he cries. Jacques is helpless to the excesses of his emotion. But this time, he returns because he loves another woman. 

Following a minor accident suffered by Lola, Dominique realizes she cannot continue living alone. She asks to meet Haydee, the new woman and tries to get along with her. Jacks and Haydee settle in his house, but he leaves, During his absence, Haydée helps Dominique care for Lola. 

Upon his return, the discomfort grows. Haydée may be pregnant, but the test is negative. Realizing her affair with Jacques has no future, Haydee leaves. Dominique, in a crazy gesture, tries to kill her with Jacques’ car.

Later, Jacques and Dominique are alone face to face, but face realize a reconciliation is impossible. Dominique vacates with Lola, leaving Jacques in his solitude.

Cast
 Dominique Laffin as Dominique 
 Haydée Politoff as Haydée 
 Jacques Doillon as Jacques 
 Lola Doillon as Lola
 Jean-Denis Robert as Jean-Denis
 Michel Vivian as Michel

Accolades

References

External links

1979 films
1979 drama films
French drama films
Films directed by Jacques Doillon
1970s French-language films
1970s French films